The UK educational evidence portal (eep) is an online resource providing easy access to published research and evidence-based guidance across all areas of education, and related aspects of children’s services. It was developed through collaboration between organisations to make research evidence more widely available to a range of audiences, including educational professionals, practitioners, policy makers and the research community.

History
The portal went live in September 2007 and is funded by a number of organisations, including CfBT Education Trust, DCSF, BIS, TDA, Becta and The National College. It is hosted by the EPPI-Centre at the Institute of Education, University of London and managed by a Development Group which meets approximately bi-monthly. A subset of this group meets as the Editorial Group which manages the content of the portal. CfBT Education Trust provides overall leadership.

The portal has been cited as a useful information resource by various academic and Government sources in the UK and elsewhere.

Eep can be searched in the following ways:

 Search websites - collections of documents from areas of a wide range of organisations contributing to eep
 Search eep database - individual documents that have been selected by a subset of organisations and indexed in greater detail by the British Education Index
 Explore key documents and links in specialised Resource Areas which focus on specific topics or educational communities.

Eep is currently developing the next release of the portal which will improve the search results for both new and more experienced users. There will be a subject list for browsing the database. Authors' names and British Education Thesaurus terms will be clickable so that related documents in the database are linked. A new text mining tool will provide automatic subject tags, on the fly, for both the database and website search.

References

External links
The UK Educational Evidence Portal
Online Education - Skill Based Learning

Bibliographic databases and indexes
British educational websites
Databases in the United Kingdom
Educational research
UCL Institute of Education
2007 establishments in the United Kingdom
Internet properties disestablished in 2007
Online databases
Scholarly databases